The Illinois Women's Open is a three-day, 54-hole state championship of golf administered by the Chicagoland Golf Publishing Company of Naperville, Illinois, and the non-profit Chicago Friends of Golf.

The tournament, founded in 1995 by Chicagoland Golf editor and publisher Phil Kosin, is open to female-at-birth professionals and amateurs age 17 and over who reside within the states of Illinois, Michigan, Indiana, Kentucky, Missouri, Iowa, Minnesota and Wisconsin. Special age and residency exemptions are also considered.

The traditional dates of the Illinois Women's Open are the Thursday, Friday and Saturday immediately following the week of the British Open in late July. The IWO championship field is limited to the top 84 players, and a qualifying round to determine the final field is scheduled if needed. The event's home course is the upland links-style Mistwood Golf Club in Romeoville, Illinois, designed by Ray Hearn.

Each year's champion has her name added to the Elaine Rosenthal Memorial Trophy, which honors one of Chicago and the nation's early women's golf pioneers. Rosenthal played in many championships in the late 1910s through the mid-1930s, representing the Chicago area and playing out of Ravisloe Country Club in Homewood, Illinois. She volunteered her services as part of "The Dixie Kids" a foursome of talented teenage golfers who barnstormed the United States in 1917–18 playing exhibition matches. Those charity matches marked the first time in the history of golf that spectators paid for tickets to watch a golf event. In this case, the money raised went to the American Red Cross to buy medical supplies for use on the battlefields of Europe. Equally remarkable are the identities of the four teens: Rosenthal and Alexa Stirling were the women; Perry Adair and Bobby Jones were the men.

Tournament hosts
1995–1998 Odyssey Golf Course, Tinley Park, Illinois
1999–2021 Mistwood Golf Club, Romeoville, Illinois

Winners

 a – denotes amateur
 P – playoff
Source: Chicagoland Golf Publishing Co., Phil Kosin and Joanne Miller

Notes

External links
Official site

Golf in Illinois
State Open golf tournaments
Women's sports in Illinois
Women's golf tournaments in the United States